Breidvik may refer to the following locations:

Breidvik, Askøy, in Askøy municipality, Vestland, Norway
Breidvik, Gulen, in Gulen municipality, Vestland, Norway
Breidvik, Nord-Trøndelag, in Inderøy municipality, Nord-Trøndelag, Norway
Breivik, Nordland, in Bodø municipality, Nordland, Norway

See also
Brevik (disambiguation)
Breivik (disambiguation)
Breivika (disambiguation)